The Rocky River is a stream in Alaska that flows into the Rocky Bay on the Kenai Peninsula at , just west of Kachemak Bay State Wilderness Park.

References

Rivers of the Kenai Peninsula
Rivers of Kenai Peninsula Borough, Alaska
Rivers of Alaska